Raghuveer Singh Koshal (22 February 1933 - 24 August 2015) was an Indian politician and a member of the Bharatiya Janata Party (BJP) political party.  He was a member of the 13th Lok Sabha and the 14th Lok Sabha of India. He represented the Kota constituency in Rajasthan state.

External links
 Official biographical sketch in Parliament of India website
  Raje Attends Condolence Meeting of BJP Leader Raghuveer Kaushal

1933 births
2015 deaths
Bharatiya Janata Party politicians from Rajasthan
Rajasthani politicians
People from Kota, Rajasthan
India MPs 1999–2004
India MPs 2004–2009
Lok Sabha members from Rajasthan
State cabinet ministers of Rajasthan